The 1996 Ball Hockey World Championship was the first ever Ball Hockey World Championship.

The championship was played in Slovakia from 11 to 15 June 1996. Canada became champions.

Participants 
 Austria
 Canada
 Czech Republic
 Germany
 Russia
 Slovakia
 Switzerland

Preliminary round

Play off

Semifinal

Bronze medal game

Final

External links 
 WC 1996
 Results

Ball Hockey World Championship
Ball Hockey World Championship